Definitive Jux Presents III (alternatively Def Jux Presents 3) is a 2004 compilation album released by American hip hop record label Definitive Jux. It peaked at number 22 on the Billboard Independent Albums chart.

Track listing

Personnel
Credits adapted from liner notes.

 Phase 2 – vocals (1)
 James Jackson Toth – bass guitar (1), synthesizer (1)
 Nasa – production (1, 3)
 Aesop Rock – vocals (2, 14), production (2, 11)
 Carnage – vocals (3)
 Mr. Lif – vocals (4)
 Akrobatik – vocals (4)
 DJ Fakts One – turntables (4), production (4)
 Rob Sonic – vocals (5), production (5)
 Alaska – vocals (6, 15)
 Windnbreeze – vocals (6, 15)
 El-P – vocals (7, 13), production (6, 7)
 Camu Tao – vocals (7, 9), production (9)
 Despot – vocals (8)
 Arcsin – production (8, 12)
 Metro – vocals (9)
 4th Pyramid – vocals (10)
 Richie Malevolence – production (10)
 Murs – vocals (11)
 C-Rayz Walz – vocals (12)
 Cage – vocals (13)
 Belief – production (13)
 Pawl – production (14, 15)
 RJD2 – production (16)

Charts

References

External links
 

2004 compilation albums
Definitive Jux compilation albums
Albums produced by Aesop Rock
Albums produced by El-P
Albums produced by RJD2
Sequel albums
Record label compilation albums
Hip hop compilation albums
East Coast hip hop compilation albums